Operation High Dive (also known as Project High Dive) was a secret project carried out during the 1950s by the United States Air Force. It tested high-altitude parachutes using anthropomorphic dummies. The dummies went into a 200 rpm flat spin, which would be fatal to a human. Further investigations on this led to Project Excelsior. It may later have been confused with Project Mogul and thus helped form the account of the Roswell incident.

External links
History of Research in Space Biology and Biodynamics - Part IV
Anthropomorphic dummy balloon drop test

Ballooning
Military parachuting
Airborne operations
Military projects of the United States
Cold War military history of the United States